Kenneth Albert James (5 August 1934 – 24 September 2014) was a Progressive Conservative member of the House of Commons of Canada. Born in Sarnia, Ontario, he was a businessman, farmer, marketing and sales manager by career. He attended Michigan State University where he graduated with a Bachelor of Arts in economics.

James served as reeve and councillor for the Township of Sarnia for a decade.

In federal politics, he represented the Ontario riding of Sarnia—Lambton where he was first elected in the 1984 federal election and re-elected in 1988, therefore becoming a member in the 33rd and 34th Canadian Parliaments.

James left federal politics after his defeat in the 1993 federal election to Roger Gallaway of the Liberal Party. He served as chair of the Blue Water Bridge Authority from 2007 until 2012. He died on 24 September 2014 at the age of 80.

Electoral record

Sarnia—Lambton

Source: Elections Canada

Source: Elections Canada

Source: Elections Canada

References

External links
 

1934 births
Members of the House of Commons of Canada from Ontario
Michigan State University alumni
People from Sarnia
Progressive Conservative Party of Canada MPs
Ontario municipal councillors
2014 deaths